Pogno is a comune (municipality) in the Province of Novara in the Italian region Piedmont, located about  northeast of Turin and about  northwest of Novara.

Pogno borders the following municipalities: Gozzano, Madonna del Sasso, San Maurizio d'Opaglio, Soriso, and Valduggia.

References

Cities and towns in Piedmont